The Huonville Lions Football Club, nicknamed The Lions, is an Australian rules football club currently playing in the Southern Football League in Huonville, Tasmania, Australia.

History
The Huonville Lions Football Club was formed as a result of a merger between former Huon Football Association clubs Huonville Bulldogs (1887–1997) and the Franklin Lions (1887–1997) at the end of the 1997 season after the Huon Football Association's demise. The Lions then joined the Southern Football League in 1998.

After a solid crack in 2019, finishing runners up to Lindisfarne, Huonville salvaged their grand final woes with a win over Cygnet in the 2020 SFL Grand Final.

Honours

Club
Southern Football League
Senior Premierships (2): 2008, 2020
Runners Up (4): 2007, 2018, 2019, 2021.
Huonville FC – Huon FA Premierships (6): 1904, 1933, 1953, 1973, 1989, 1992
Franklin FC – Huon FA Premierships (10): 1903, 1907, 1932, 1958, 1959, 1963, 1982, 1985, 1987, 1997
Franklin FC – Tasmanian Country Football Champions (1): 1958
Club Record Score: Huonville Lions 57.20 (362) v. Triabunna 0.3 (3) on 24 July 2010 at Huonville Recreation Ground
Peter Hodgeman Medal winners
 Nick Doyle (2006).
William Leitch Medal winners
James Lange (2010)
Jarrod Lawler (2018)
Ethan Brock (2020)
Club Games Record Holder
 450+ - Steven "Runner" Reeve.

External links
 Official Facebook

Australian rules football clubs in Tasmania
1998 establishments in Australia